Robert Simpson MacLellan (2 July 1925 – 15 January 2011) was a Progressive Conservative party member of the House of Commons of Canada. He was born in Sydney, Nova Scotia and became a lawyer by career.

After an unsuccessful campaign in the 1957 federal election unseat Inverness—Richmond Liberal incumbent Allan MacEachen, MacLellan won the seat in the 1958 general election. MacLellan served one term before MacEachen regained the riding in the 1962 election.

MacLellan contracted lung cancer and died in Ottawa at age 85.

References

External links
 

1925 births
2011 deaths
Members of the House of Commons of Canada from Nova Scotia
Progressive Conservative Party of Canada MPs
Canadian lawyers
Deaths from lung cancer
Deaths from cancer in Ontario